This is a list of shipwrecks located in or around the United States of America.

Alabama

Alaska

Arizona

Arkansas

California

Connecticut

Delaware

Florida

Georgia

Great Lakes

Guam

Hawaii

Indiana

Kansas

Kentucky

Louisiana

Maine

Maryland

Massachusetts

Michigan

Minnesota

Mississippi

Missouri

Montana

Nebraska

Nevada

New Hampshire

New Jersey

New York

North Carolina

North Dakota

Ohio

Oregon

Pennsylvania

Puerto Rico

Rhode Island

South Carolina

South Dakota

Tennessee

Texas

Vermont

Virginia

Wake Island

Washington

Wisconsin

Wyoming

References

Further reading

External links
 WRECKSITE Worldwide free database of + 65,000 wrecks with history, maritime charts and GPS positions
 University of Washington Libraries Digital Collections – John E. Thwaites Photographs Images of Southeastern Alaska from 1905 to 1912 including maritime disasters such as the Farallon, Mariposa, Edith, and Jabez Howes shipwrecks.

Shipwrecks
 
Shipwrecks